Baiae was an ancient Roman town situated on the northwest shore of the Gulf of Naples and now in the comune of Bacoli. It was a fashionable resort for centuries in antiquity, particularly towards the end of the Roman Republic, when it was reckoned as superior to Capri, Pompeii, and Herculaneum by wealthy Romans, who built villas here from 100 BC to AD 500. It was notorious for its hedonistic offerings and the attendant rumours of corruption and scandal.

The lower part of the town later became submerged in the sea due to local volcanic, bradyseismic activity which raised or lowered the land, and recent underwater archaeology has revealed many of the fine buildings now protected in the submerged archaeological park.

Many impressive buildings from the upper town can be seen in the Parco Archeologico delle Terme di Baia.

Name
Baiae was said to have been named after Baius (Baîos), the helmsman of Odysseus's ship in Homer's Odyssey, who was supposedly buried nearby. The adjacent "" was named after the town. It now forms the western part of the Gulf of Pozzuoli.

The settlement was also mentioned in 178 BC under the name  ("Cumaean Waters").

History

Baiae was built on the Cumaean Peninsula in the Phlegraean Fields, an active volcanic area. It was perhaps originally developed as the port for Cumae.

Baiae was particularly fashionable towards the end of the Roman Republic. Marius, Lucullus, and Pompey all frequented it. Julius Caesar had a villa there, and much of the town became imperial property under Augustus. Nero had a notable villa constructed in the middle of the 1st century and Hadrian died at his villa in AD 138. It was also a favourite spot of the emperor Septimius Severus. The resorts sometimes capitalised on their imperial associations: Suetonius mentions in his history that the cloak, brooch, and gold bulla given to the young Tiberius by Pompey's daughter Pompeia Magna were still on display around AD 120.

According to Suetonius, in AD 39, Baiae was the location for a stunt by the eccentric emperor Caligula to answer the astrologer Thrasyllus's prediction that he had "no more chance of becoming emperor than of riding a horse across the Gulf of Baiae". Caligula ordered a 3-mile-long pontoon bridge to be built from impounded ships of the area, fastened together and weighted with sand, stretching from Baiae to the neighbouring port of Puteoli. Clad in a gold cloak, he then crossed it upon a horse. Cassius Dio's Roman History also includes the event, with the detail that the emperor ordered resting places and lodging rooms with potable water erected at intervals along the bridge. As late as the 18th century, scattered fragments were still being shown to tourists as the "Bridge of Caligula". Malloch has argued that Suetonius's account was likely coloured by his bias against Caligula; instead, he claims that "the act of bridging the Bay of Naples was an excellent—and safe—means by which to lay the foundation for [Caligula’s] military glory."

Baiae was notorious for the hedonistic lifestyle of its residents and guests. In 56 BC, the prominent socialite Clodia was condemned by the defence at the trial of Marcus Caelius Rufus as living as a harlot in Rome and at the "crowded resort of Baiae", indulging in beach parties and long drinking sessions. An elegy by Sextus Propertius written in the Augustan Age describes it as a "den of licentiousness and vice". In the 1st century, "Baiae and Vice" formed one of the moral epistles written by Seneca the Younger; he described it as a "vortex of luxury" and a "harbour of vice" where girls went to play at being girls, old women as girls and some men as girls according to a first century BC wag.

It never attained municipal status, being administered throughout by nearby Cumae.

Baiae was sacked during the barbarian invasions and again by Muslim raiders in the 8th century.

Archaeology
The site had occasionally revealed Roman sculptures. The Aphrodite of Baiae, a variant of the Venus de Medici, was supposedly excavated there sometime before 1803, when the English antiquary Thomas Hope began displaying it in his gallery on Duchess Street in London.

The important archaeological remains were intensively excavated from 1941, revealing layers of buildings, villas and thermal complexes belonging to periods from the late Republican age, the Augustan, Hadrianic to the late Empire.

The lowering of the ground below sea level, due to bradyseism, seems to have occurred in two phases: between the third and fifth centuries, still in the late Imperial era, followed by a more substantial submersion a century later. The lower part of Baiae was largely submerged by the sea by the 8th century.

A cache of plaster casts of Hellenistic sculptures was discovered in the cellar of the Baths of Sosandra at Baiae; they are now displayed at the town's archaeological museum. The collection includes parts of several famous sculptures, including Athens's Harmodius and Aristogeiton and the Athena of Velletri. It suggests that the area had a workshop mass-producing marble or bronze copies of Greek art for the Italian market.

Monuments

Among the most significant and remarkable remains are several dome-like structures such as the great so-called Temple of Mercury, the Temple of Venus, and the Temple of Diana, which were traditionally credited to some of the more famous residents of the town's villas, (although they were not temples but parts of thermal baths).

Temple of Diana

This colossal ogival dome, today half collapsed, originally collected vapours coming from the ground below and was used for thermal baths. It was decorated with marble friezes depicting hunting scenes.

Temple of Mercury

The so-called "Temple of Mercury" contains a large  diameter dome, the largest in the world prior to the construction of Rome's Pantheon in 128 AD. The dome has a central hole or oculus, four square skylights, was made with large tuff blocks, and is the oldest known surviving dome made of concrete. Built in the 1st century BC during the late Roman Republic, it was used to enclose the frigidarium or cold pool of the public baths. From the eighteenth century descriptions it appeared to have had six niches of which four were semicircular.

Temple of Venus

Another octagonal building, sunken 3 metres in the ground, had eight large arched windows and a balcony inside overlooking the pool. It owes its name to Scipione Mazzella who claimed to have found the statue of the goddess there.

Villa of the Ambulatio

Overlooking the sea is the "Villa of the Ambulatio" with a series of six terraces connected to each other by a complex of staircases of which the last leads to the "sector of Mercury". It is named after the 'ambulatio', the long corridor with two longitudinal naves on the second terrace, intended to be a covered walk with large openings with a magnificent panorama of the gulf below. Traces of precious stucco can be seen on the brick structure of the central pillars.

On the upper terrace were the residential areas, once richly decorated with several rooms dedicated to leisure. The third terrace is now transformed into a tree-lined garden. The fourth terrace was for service areas. On the fifth terrace are several rooms probably used as places to stay and rest, open to the sea and to the last terrace below that once was occupied by a garden, as today, perhaps surrounded by a colonnade.

Sector of Sosandra
Bounded by two parallel staircases is the sector or "Temple of Sosandra" from the name of the statue found in 1953 and now located in the National Museum of Naples.

The complexity of this sector on four terraces does not allow its intended use to be identified but it was either a spa, a villa, a hospitalia (a sort of hotel for visitors to the nearby spa), or even a meeting place of Nero for the entertainment of sailors of the nearby Classis Misenensis, the Miseno fleet.

On the highest terrace are service areas and a small balneum with rich stucco decorations on the ceiling. The next level has a large terrace open to the sea and bordered on three sides by a portico. In the garden are four parallel walls that perhaps delimited three triclinia in the open. Above the peristyle are several residential rooms, once richly finished, particularly the original precious mosaic floors representing theatrical masks inside geometric frames. Below this level is a semicircular building surmounted by five vaulted rooms once hidden by a façade decorated with niches and columns, overall making an impressive composition. On the axis of the complex is a room perhaps used as a nymphaeum from which flowed the water that fed an existing large external circular tank. On the peristyle of the lower terrace are paintings from two successive periods: those with an Egyptian taste (characters and symbols of the cult of Isis) from the middle of the 1st century AD; these are largely covered by paintings of the 2nd century, which depict male and female figures within architectural schemes.

Other sites

The public and private baths of Baiae were filled with warm mineral water directed to their pools from underground hot springs, as many still are today. Roman engineers were also able to construct a complex system of chambers that channelled underground heat into facilities that acted as saunas. In addition to their recreational function, the baths were used in Roman medicine to treat various illnesses and physicians would attend their patients at the springs.

Baiae was supplied with fresh drinking water from a branch of the Aqua Augusta aqueduct, a cross-section of which can be seen nearby.

Cultural depictions
 Seneca the Younger, the  Roman Stoic philosopher, makes reference to this city in one of his Epistulae Morales ad Lucilium.
 Giovanni Gioviano Pontano (d. 1503) wrote his Two Books of Hendecasyllables on the pleasures of Baiae.
 The lost wonders of Baiae were a common feature of Romantic poetry. It appears in John Keats's "Ode to May" and in the third stanza of Shelley's "Ode to the West Wind". The vanished columns of the ancient town inundated by the sea is the central conceit of Konstantin Batyushkov's 1819 "You awake, oh Bayya, from the tomb...", "one of his last and finest poems".
 The "princely" seaside resort of the empire appears in J. Meade Falkner's 1895 novel The Lost Stradivarius and Anatole France's 1902 "Procurator of Judea". In current fiction, it is the setting of Caroline Lawrence's Sirens of Surrentum; John Maddox Roberts's Under the Shadow of Vesuvius; Steven Saylor's 1992 Arms of Nemesis, set during the Spartacus Rebellion; and Marguerite Yourcenar's Memoirs of Hadrian.
 In the Ecce Romani series of Latin textbooks, Baiae is the location of the character Gaius Cornelius Calvus's summer villa.
 Baiae was featured in the PBS show Secrets of the Dead in the March 2017 episode "Nero's Sunken City".
 Baiae was featured on Channel 4 programme Rome's Sunken Secrets, which aired on in the UK on 16 April 2017.
 A forgotten Baiae tunnel complex features prominently in the UK series called Forbidden History, whereby the presenter visits a supposed grotto of the Cumaean Sibyl.

See also
Fusaro Lake
List of Roman cisterns
List of Roman domes

Notes

References
 
 
 .
 
 .
 .

External links

Frazioni of the Province of Naples
Roman sites of Campania
Spa towns in Italy
Former populated places in Italy
Roman towns and cities in Italy
Bacoli
Archaeological sites in Campania
Submerged places